Jackson v Union Marine Insurance (1874) 10 Common Pleas 125 is an early English contract law case concerning the right to terminate an agreement.

Facts
Mr. Jackson owned a ship - the Spirit of the Dawn. In November 1871 he entered a charter-party for the ship to go from Liverpool to Newport, and load iron rails, which were going to be used for a new line in San Francisco. Mr Jackson also had an insurance policy with Union Marine Insurance, which covered losses for "perils of the sea". The ship left on 2 January 1872 but ran aground in Carnarvon Bay the next day. She needed repairs until August. The charterers on 15 February secured another ship to carry the rails. Jackson brought an action on the insurance policy on the chartered freight.

The jury held that the delay for repairs was so long that it brought the contract in a commercial sense to an end.

Judgment
Bramwell B held with the majority (Blackburn J, Mellor J, Lush J and Amphlett B) that the jury had been correct. The delay meant the charterers were not bound to load the ship and that there was a loss of the chartered freight by perils of the sea.

See also
English contract law

Notes

References

Lord Blackburn cases
Baron Bramwell cases
English termination case law
1874 in case law
1874 in British law
Court of Exchequer Chamber cases